Gian Paolo Dulbecco (La Spezia,12 September 1941) is an Italian painter.

Biography
Gian Paolo Dulbecco was born in La Spezia in 1941. In 1958 he moved with his family to Milan, where he was a student of Tommaso Gnone, whose teachings inspired him to begin painting and learn drypoint etching techniques. In March 1966 he graduated from the Polytechnic University of Milan, continuing to cultivate his interest in art, even though without any professional art education.

In 1969 he lived in Rome where he got to see the painting of Balthus exhibited at Villa Medici. Afterwards, he moved back to Milan, which was the basis for several trips in Europe. He was particularly inspired by the painting of Delvaux, Magritte and the great Flemish painters he got to see while visiting Belgium.
He began to develop his theme of Stone Ships, as a reminder of the Tiber Island, which is followed by those of Oracles, Nocturnes and the metaphysical Ideal Cities.
He also confronted the field of sacred art, especially with the Nativities inspired by the 15th-century Thebaids.
In 1975 he settled in Monza. 

He took part to numerous exhibitions, both personal and collective, in several Italian cities. In 1984 he received a Cartier Award with the work Stories of the Woods. In 1992 he was among the awardees of Arte magazine. 
French critic Pierre Restany invited him to exhibit his Tarot series at the group show Art & Tabac, which took place in Rome in 1993 and in the following years in Vienna and Amsterdam.
His paintings were exhibited in London, Freiburg, Porto, at the Italian Cultural Institutes in Lyon, Lisbon and Brussels, and finally in Tokyo. New Japanese exhibitions took place again in 1998 in Yokohama, and in 1999 and 2001 in Tokyo. In the late 1990s, he was inspired by the myth of Atlantis.

In 2002 the Superintendence of Cultural Heritage of Salerno sponsored an anthological exhibition of his work in Ravello, where his paintings were exhibited again with Luzzati in 2005.

Those were the years in which the masque of Pulcinella, interpreted as a universal human archetype, began to appear in his paintings. In the same years, he tackled the themes of the Characters struggling against their own shadow, of Labyrinths and of Mysterious Cages.

In 2012 he is invited by the Panorama Museum to present some works at the group show Dopo de Chirico, dedicated to contemporary Italian metaphysical painting. 

Afterwards came a period of secluded work in which he tackled the theme of Invisible Cities.

His solo exhibitions are now increasingly rare, according to an aspiration to a reserved silence and a rejection of the current spectacularizing and business planning of art.
He is an artist whose works, generally restrained in size and often built on the golden section, have been likened by critics to the modes of Magic Realism.

Collections

 Panorama Museum, Bad Frankenhausen, Germany
 Fantastic Art Collection, Gruyères Castle, Switzerland
 FAI Heritage (National Trust of Italy), Milan
 Lombardy regional art collection, Palazzo Lombardia, Milan
   Heritage of the Municipality of Monza
 Paul VI Art collection, Concesio, (Brescia)
 Gonzaga Museum, Mantua
 Tarots Museum, Riola di Vergato, (Bologna)
 Mario Novaro Foundation, Genoa
 Museo dei Trasporti, La Spezia
 Pietrasanta City Council art collection
 Cervia City Council art collection
 Vatican Contemporary Art Collection, Rome
 Ravello City Council art collection
 Province of Palermo paintings collection, Palermo

See also
Magic realism

Bibliography
 Allgemeines Künstlerlexikon, de Gruyter GmbH, Berlin
 Catalogo d’Arte Moderna, Mondadori, Milan
 Art & Tabac, catalogo della mostra al Tabakmuseum, Vienna, 1995
 P. Morselli, F. Gozzi, U. Montanari, Carnevalesca, il travestimento, la festa, catalogo della mostra a Cento, Ed. Siaca, Cento, 2003
 Gian Paolo Dulbecco, La via Crucis per la Chiesa di S.Gemma Galgani in Monza (1983-85), Monza, 2006
 C. Caserta, Pulcinella, viaggio nell’ultimo Novecento - Dulbecco, Lubelli, Luzzati, Mautone, ESI, Napoli, 2006, 
Dopo de Chirico. La pittura metafisica italiana contemporanea. Catalog - Panorama Museum, Bad Frankenhausen, 2012, 
 C.Caserta, Gian Paolo Dulbecco, antologia della pittura, Edizioni Scientifiche Italiane, Napoli, 2016, 
 A.Sartori: Catalogo Sartori d'arte moderna e contemporanea - 2018, Archivio Sartori Editore, Mantova, 2018
 N.Del Buono: The best of the year, 90 Italian highlights, AD (Italy), Nov. 2019
 V.P.Cremolini, I mondi di Dulbecco, Edizioni del Porticciolo, La Spezia, 2022

External links
 Gian Paolo Dulbecco Ten Dreams Galleries
 Settemuse
  Artist's website: dulbecco.eu

20th-century Italian painters
20th-century Italian male artists
Italian male painters
21st-century Italian painters
1941 births
Modern painters
Living people
21st-century Italian male artists